Olga Govortsova and Alla Kudryavtseva were the defending champions but Govortsova decided not to participate.
Kudryavtseva played alongside Iveta Benešová.
Tímea Babos and Hsieh Su-wei won the title beating top seeded Liezel Huber and Lisa Raymond in the final, 7–5, 6–7(2–7), [10–8]

Seeds

Draw

Draw

References
 Main Draw

Aegon Classic - Doubles
Doubles